Oxybia is a monotypic snout moth genus described by Hans Rebel in 1901. Its only species, Oxybia transversella, was described by Philogène Auguste Joseph Duponchel in 1836. It is found in southern Europe and on the Canary Islands.

Adults have grey or brownish-grey forewings with a narrow vertical yellowish-brown line with a darker spot above the dorsum on the outside. The hindwings are greyish brown. Specimens from Fuerteventura are different. They have a uniform pale yellowish forewing almost without any markings, except for a dark spot which is sometimes present above the middle of the dorsum. The hindwings are purely white.

The larvae feed on Psoralea bituminosa.

References

Phycitinae
Monotypic moth genera
Moths of Europe
Pyralidae genera